Thengaperumalpalayam is a village in Vengarai, Paramathi Velur, Namakkal district, Tamil Nadu, India.

References 

Villages in Namakkal district